The Volkswagen I.D. R also known as Volkswagen I.D. R Pikes Peak, is a prototype fully electric vehicle designed as part of Volkswagen's I.D. Project, and included within Volkswagen's R series of cars designed specifically for competing in motorsport events. It is the first electric racing car designed by Volkswagen.

History
Following the Volkswagen emissions scandal in 2015, the company pulled out of motorsport events such as the World Rally Championship (which they had won every year since 2013), the Dakar Rally (3 straight wins since 2009) and the 24 Hours of Le Mans (13 wins with its Audi and Bentley brands in the 15 years prior to 2014).

The Volkswagen I.D. R made its competition début at the Pikes Peak International Hill climb in Colorado Springs, Colorado on 24 June 2018. It was driven by Romain Dumas, and the team set a target of beating the existing electric car record of 8:57.118 minutes, set in 2016 by Rhys Millen with the Drive eO PP100. The I.D. R became the first car to complete the hill climb in under eight minutes (7:57.148), breaking the outright record set by Sébastien Loeb and the Peugeot 208 T16 Pikes Peak.

In 2018 the Dewar Trophy was awarded to Integral Powertrain (the provider of the motors used by Volkswagen) for their electric motors and drivers. Previous winners include Keith Duckworth for the Cosworth DFV engine and Mercedes AMG High Performance Powertrains for their Formula 1 hybrid powertrain.

On 3 June 2019 the ID.R used 24.7 kWh to break the electric vehicle lap record on the Nürburgring with a time of 6:05.336, cornering at up to 3.49 g. The record time was previously held by the NIO EP9 driven by Peter Dumbreck. Again driven by Dumas, the ID. In 2019, the I.D. R set a new record for the Goodwood Festival of Speed Hillclimb clocking in at 39.90, also by Dumas.

On 2 September 2019, Dumas set a benchmark with the Volkswagen ID.R on the  Shan Big Gate Road on Tianmen Mountain of 7:38.585.

In February 2020, Volkswagen confirmed that a second version of the I.D. R would be built. Named the I.D. R Evo, this version of the car is expected to continue to make record attempts at various tracks and courses around the world, potentially revisiting some benchmarks set by the original I.D. R car. Volkswagen has since announced it would abandon motorsports for their flagship brand, though they continue to support motorsports for their premium brands.

Track times set

Technical specifications 
The I.D. R weighs under  and has a 0 to  time of 2.25 seconds. It has a single 45-kWh battery. The Chassis of the car was co-developed by Norma, French sports prototype and hillclimb specialist.

In media

Television 
The I.D. R appeared in the fifth episode of season 28 of Top Gear, with host Chris Harris pitting it against a McLaren 720S.

Video games 
The I.D. R made its video game debut as paid downloadable content for V-Rally 4.

RaceRoom Racing Experience partnered with Volkswagen to feature the I.D. R in a time attack challenge on the Nürburgring Nordschleife; the competition ran from 24 April to 24 October 2019. It would later be featured in the title's 21 December 2020 content update.

Forza Horizon 4 saw the I.D. R join its vehicle roster as part of the Series 14 update.

Real Racing 3 saw I.D. R join the roster as part of the 9.2 update.

The Volkswagen I.D. R was added in the Electric Season Update in Asphalt 9: Legends.

On 29th September 2022 the Volkswagen I.D. R was added to Gran Turismo 7 with the update to 1.23.

See also 
 McMurtry Spéirling, an electric prototype car manufactured by McMurtry Automotive.

References 

I.D._R
Experimental vehicles
Norma Auto Concept
Green racing
Electric sports cars